Cape Martin is a headland situated in the commune of Roquebrune-Cap-Martin, Alpes-Maritimes département, in southern France. It is situated on the Mediterranean Sea coast between Monaco and Menton. Cap-Martin, an affluent residential area of Roquebrune-Cap-Martin, was named after the headland.

References
 Roquebrune-Cap-Martin, France,

Martin
Landforms of Alpes-Maritimes
Landforms of Provence-Alpes-Côte d'Azur